Ernst Alfred Cassirer (July 28, 1874 – April 13, 1945) was a German philosopher. Trained within the Neo-Kantian Marburg School, he initially followed his mentor Hermann Cohen in attempting to supply an idealistic philosophy of science.

After Cohen's death in 1918, Cassirer developed a theory of symbolism and used it to expand phenomenology of knowledge into a more general philosophy of culture. Cassirer was one of the leading 20th-century advocates of philosophical idealism. His most famous work is the Philosophy of Symbolic Forms (1923–1929).

Though his work received a mixed reception shortly after his death, more recent scholarship has remarked upon Cassirer's role as a strident defender of the moral idealism of the Enlightenment era and the cause of liberal democracy at a time when the rise of fascism had made such advocacy unfashionable. Within the international Jewish community, Cassirer's work has additionally been seen as part of a long tradition of thought on ethical philosophy.

Biography
Born in Breslau in Silesia (modern-day southwest Poland), into a Jewish family, Cassirer studied literature and philosophy at the University of Marburg (where he completed his doctoral work in 1899 with a dissertation on René Descartes's analysis of mathematical and natural scientific knowledge entitled  [Descartes' Critique of Mathematical and Scientific Knowledge]) and at the University of Berlin (where he completed his habilitation in 1906 with the dissertation  [The Problem of Knowledge in Philosophy and Science in the Modern Age: Volume I]).

Politically, Cassirer supported the liberal German Democratic Party (DDP).
On 30 January 1933, the Nazi Regime came to power. Cassirer left Germany on 12 March 1933 - one week after the first Reichstagswahl under that Regime - because he was Jewish.

After leaving Germany he taught for a couple of years at the University of Oxford, before becoming a professor at Gothenburg University. When Cassirer considered Sweden too unsafe, he applied for a post at Harvard University, but was rejected because thirty years earlier he had rejected a job offer from them. In 1941 he became a visiting professor at Yale University, then moved to Columbia University in New York City, where he lectured from 1943 until his death in 1945.

Cassirer died of a heart attack in April 1945 in New York City. The young rabbi Arthur Hertzberg, who was a student of Cassirer's at Columbia University, conducted the funeral service. His grave is located in Westwood, New Jersey, on the Cedar Park Beth-El Cemeteries in the graves of the Congregation Habonim. His son, Heinz Cassirer, was also a Kantian scholar. 

Other members of his prominent family included the neurologist Richard Cassirer, the publisher and gallery owner Bruno Cassirer and the art dealer and editor Paul Cassirer.

Influences
Donald Phillip Verene, who published some of Cassirer's papers kept at Yale University, gave this overview of his ideas:
"Cassirer as a thinker became an embodiment of Kantian principles, but also of much more, of an overall movement of spirit stretching from the Renaissance to the Enlightenment, and on to Herder’s conception of history, Goethe’s poetry, Wilhelm von Humboldt’s study of the Kavi language, Schelling’s , Hegel’s Phenomenology of Spirit, and Vischer’s conception of the aesthetic symbol, among many others. Cassirer’s own position is born through a mastery of the whole development of this world of the humanistic understanding, which included the rise of the scientific world view — a mastery evident both in his historical works and in his systematic philosophy."

Work

History of science
Cassirer's first major published writings were a history of modern thought from the Renaissance to Kant. In accordance with his Marburg neo-Kantianism he concentrated upon epistemology. His reading of the scientific revolution, in books such as The Individual and the Cosmos in Renaissance Philosophy (1927), as a "Platonic" application of mathematics to nature, influenced historians such as E. A. Burtt, E. J. Dijksterhuis, and Alexandre Koyré.

Philosophy of science
In Substance and Function (1910), he writes about late nineteenth-century developments in physics including relativity theory and the foundations of mathematics. In Einstein's Theory of Relativity (1921) he defended the claim that modern physics supports a neo-Kantian conception of knowledge. He also wrote a book about Quantum mechanics called Determinism and Indeterminism in Modern Physics (1936).

Philosophy of symbolic forms
At Hamburg Cassirer discovered the Library of the Cultural Sciences founded by Aby Warburg. Warburg was an art historian who was particularly interested in ritual and myth as sources of surviving forms of emotional expression. In Philosophy of Symbolic Forms (1923–29) Cassirer argues that man (as he put it in his more popular 1944 book Essay on Man) is a "symbolic animal". Whereas animals perceive their world by instincts and direct sensory perception, humans create a universe of symbolic meanings. Cassirer is particularly interested in natural language and myth. He argues that science and mathematics developed from natural language, and religion and art from myth.

The Cassirer–Heidegger debate

In 1929 Cassirer took part in a historically significant encounter with Martin Heidegger in Davos during the Second Davos Hochschulkurs (the Cassirer–Heidegger debate). Cassirer argues that while Kant's Critique of Pure Reason emphasizes human temporality and finitude, he also sought to situate human cognition within a broader conception of humanity. Cassirer challenges Heidegger's relativism by invoking the universal validity of truths discovered by the exact and moral sciences.

Philosophy of the Enlightenment
Cassirer believed that reason's self-realization leads to human liberation. Mazlish (2000), however, notes that Cassirer in his The Philosophy of the Enlightenment (1932) focuses exclusively on ideas, ignoring the political and social context in which they were produced.

The Logic of the Cultural Sciences
In The Logic of the Cultural Sciences (1942) Cassirer argues that objective and universal validity can be achieved not only in the sciences, but also in practical, cultural, moral, and aesthetic phenomena. Although inter-subjective objective validity in the natural sciences derives from universal laws of nature, Cassirer asserts that an analogous type of inter-subjective objective validity takes place in the cultural sciences.

The Myth of the State
Cassirer's last work, The Myth of the State (1946), was published posthumously; at one level it is an attempt to understand the intellectual origins of Nazi Germany. Cassirer sees Nazi Germany as a society in which the dangerous power of myth is not checked or subdued by superior forces. The book discusses the opposition of logos and mythos in Greek thought, Plato's Republic, the medieval theory of the state, Machiavelli, Thomas Carlyle's writings on hero worship, the racial theories of Arthur de Gobineau, and Hegel. Cassirer claimed that in 20th-century politics there was a return, with the passive acquiescence of Martin Heidegger, to the irrationality of myth, and in particular to a belief that there is such a thing as destiny. Of this passive acquiescence, Cassirer says that in departing from Husserl's belief in an objective, logical basis for philosophy, Heidegger attenuated the ability of philosophy to oppose the resurgence of myth in German politics of the 1930s.

Partial bibliography
Leibniz' System in seinem wissenschaftlichen Grundlagen (1902)
The Problem of Knowledge: Philosophy, Science, and History since Hegel [Das Erkenntnisproblem in der Philosophie und Wissenschaft der neueren Zeit] (1906–1920), English translation 1950 (online edition)
"Kant und die moderne Mathematik." Kant-Studien (1907)
 Substance and Function [Substanzbegriff und Funktionsbegriff] (1910) and Einstein's Theory of Relativity [Einsteinschen Relativitätstheorie ] (1921), English translation 1923 (online edition)
 Freedom and Form [Freiheit und Form] (1916)
 Kant's Life and Thought [Kants Leben und Lehre] (1918), English translation 1981
 Philosophy of Symbolic Forms [Philosophie der symbolischen Formen] (1923–29), English translation 1953–1957
 Volume One: Language [Erster Teil: Die Sprache] (1923), English translation 1955
 Volume Two: Mythical Thought [Zweiter Teil: Das mythische Denken] (1925), English translation 1955
 Volume Three: The Phenomenology of Knowledge [Dritter Teil: Phänomenologie der Erkenntnis] (1929), English translation 1957
 Language and Myth  [Sprache und Mythos] (1925), English translation 1946 by Susanne K. Langer
 The Individual and the Cosmos in Renaissance Philosophy  [Individuum und Kosmos in der Philosophie der Renaissance] (1927), English translation 1963 by Mario Domandi
"Erkenntnistheorie nebst den Grenzfragen der Logik und Denkpsychologie." Jahrbücher der Philosophie 3, 31-92 (1927)
Die Idee der republikanischen Verfassung (1929)
"Kant und das Problem der Metaphysik. Bemerkungen zu Martin Heideggers Kantinterpretation." Kant-Studien 26, 1-16 (1931)
 Philosophy of the Enlightenment  [Die Philosophie der Aufklärung] (1932), English translation 1951
 Determinism and Indeterminism in Modern Physics: Historical and Systematic Studies of the Problem of Causality  [Determinismus und Indeterminismus in der modernen Physik] (1936), English translation 1956
 The Logic of the Cultural Sciences [Zur Logik der Kulturwissenschaften] (1942), English translation 2000 by Steve G. Lofts (previously translated in 1961 as The Logic of the Humanities)
 An Essay on Man (written and published in English) (1944) (books.google.com)
 The Myth of the State (written and published in English) (posthumous) (1946) (books.google.com)
 Symbol, Myth, and Culture: Essays and Lectures of Ernst Cassirer, 1935-1945, ed. by Donald Phillip Verene (March 11, 1981)
 Ernst Cassirer: Gesammelte Werke. Hamburger Ausgabe. Electronic Edition. (2016) – The electronic version of the definitive edition of Cassirer's works, published in print by Felix Meiner Verlag, and electronically in the Past Masters series.
 The Warburg Years (1919-1933): Essays on Language, Art, Myth, and Technology. Translated and with an Introduction by S. G. Lofts with A. Calcagno. New Haven & London: Yale University Press.

References

Further reading
Aubenque, Pierre, et al. "Philosophie und Politik: Die Davoser Disputation zwischen Ernst Cassirer und Martin Heidgger in der Retrospektive." Internationale Zeitschrift für Philosophie, 2: 290-312
Barash, Jeffrey Andrew. The Symbolic Construction of Reality: The Legacy of Ernst Cassirer (2008) (excerpt and text search)
Burtt, Edwin Arthur. The Metaphysical Foundations of Modern Physical Science, London: Paul Trencher (2000)
 Eilenberger, Wolfram. Time of the Magicians: The invention of modern thought, 1919–29,  Allen Lane (2020)
 Folkvord Ingvild & Hoel Aud Sissel (eds.), Ernst Cassirer on Form and Technology: Contemporary Readings, (2012), Basingstoke, Palgrave MacMillan.
 Friedman, Michael. A Parting of the Ways: Carnap, Cassirer, and Heidegger (2000) (excerpt and text search)
 Gordon, Peter Eli. Continental Divide: Heidegger, Cassirer, Davos (2010)
 Krois, John Michael. Cassirer: Symbolic Forms and History (Yale University Press 1987)
 Lassègue, Jean. Cassirer’s Transformation: From a Transcendental to a Semiotic Philosophy of Forms. Springer, 2020. (Studies in Applied Philosophy, Epistemology and Rational Ethics book series. volume 55) Online  
 Lipton, David R. Ernst Cassirer: The Dilemma of a Liberal Intellectual in Germany, 1914-1933 (1978)
 Lofts. Steve G. Ernst Cassirer: A "Repetition" of Modernity (2000) SUNY Press, : at Google Books
 Magerski, Christine. "Reaching Beyond the Supra-Historical Sphere: from Cassirer's Philosophy of Symbolic Forms to Bourdieu's Sociology of Symbolic Forms." ´´Pierre Bourdieu and the Field of Cultural Production.´´ Ed. J. Browitt. University of Delaware Press (2004): 21-29.
 Schilpp, Paul Arthur (ed.). The Philosophy of Ernst Cassirer (1949) archive.org
 Schultz, William. Cassirer & Langer on Myth (2nd ed. 2000) (excerpt and text search)
 Skidelsky, Edward. Ernst Cassirer: The Last Philosopher of Culture (Princeton University Press, 2008), 288 pp. .
Hardy, Anton G. "Symbol Philosophy and the Opening into Consciousness and Creativity" (2014)

External links

 
 History of the Cassirer Family
 Ernst Cassirer in family context
 Centre for Intercultural Studies
 
 
 
 Ernst Cassirer Papers. General Collection, Beinecke Rare Book and Manuscript Library. Yale University.
 Ernst Cassirer Papers - Addition. General Collection, Beinecke Rare Book and Manuscript Library, Yale University.

 
Kantian philosophers
1874 births
1945 deaths
People from the Province of Silesia
Writers from Wrocław
Humboldt University of Berlin alumni
Academic staff of the Humboldt University of Berlin
Academic staff of the University of Hamburg
Academics of the University of Oxford
Columbia University faculty
Yale University faculty
Academic staff of the University of Gothenburg
20th-century German philosophers
German historians of philosophy
Phenomenologists
German semioticians
Idealists
Continental philosophers
Jewish philosophers
Jewish emigrants from Nazi Germany to the United States